Luigi Robbiati (born 18 June 1935 in Robbiate) is an Italian former footballer who played as a defender in Serie A for Internazionale in the 1950s.

His son Anselmo Robbiati played in Serie A for ACF Fiorentina.

References

External links
 https://www.inter.it/en/archivio_giocatore/G0550

1935 births
Living people
Italian footballers
Association football defenders
Inter Milan players
A.C. Prato players
A.C. Reggiana 1919 players
A.C. Cesena players
Serie A players
Serie B players
A.S. Siracusa players